is a Japanese football player currently playing for Matsumoto Yamaga FC.

Career statistics
Updated to 23 February 2017.

FIFA Club World Cup Career Statistics

Team honors

Gamba Osaka
AFC Champions League - 2008
Pan-Pacific Championship - 2008
Emperor's Cup - 2008, 2009
J2 League - 2013

References

External links

Profile at Matsumoto Yamaga

1986 births
Living people
Ryutsu Keizai University alumni
Association football people from Tochigi Prefecture
Japanese footballers
J1 League players
J2 League players
Gamba Osaka players
Vegalta Sendai players
Matsumoto Yamaga FC players
Association football midfielders